Baron Charles George Maurice de Worms (1903–1979) was an English chemist and lepidopterist.

Biography

Early life

Charles de Worms was born in Egham, Surrey, in 1903. He was the son of Baron Anthony Denis Maurice George de Worms (1869–1938) and Louisa Matilda Goldscmidt. His paternal great-grandfather, Solomon Benedict de Worms (1801–1882), owned large plantations in Ceylon and was made a Hereditary Baron of the Austrian Empire by Franz Joseph I of Austria (1830–1916), and his paternal grandmother was Henrietta Samuel.

His paternal great-great-grandmother was Schönche Jeannette Rothschild (1771–1859), thus his paternal great-great-great-grandfather was Mayer Amschel Rothschild (1744–1812), the founder of the Rothschild banking dynasty. As a result, his paternal great-great-great-granduncles were Amschel Mayer Rothschild (1773–1855), Salomon Mayer von Rothschild (1774–1855), Nathan Mayer Rothschild (1777–1836), Carl Mayer von Rothschild (1788–1855), and James Mayer de Rothschild (1792–1868). His great-great-uncles, who owned plantations in Ceylon with his great-grandfather, were Maurice Benedict de Worms (1805–1867) and Gabriel Benedict de Worms (1802–1881). His paternal great-uncle was Henry de Worms, 1st Baron Pirbright (1840–1903).

He was educated at Eton College and King's College, Cambridge.

Career

Most of de Worms working life was spent as a chemist in the Institute of the Royal Cancer Hospital and Porton Down Experimental Station, producing numerous papers on cancer. He became interested in ornithology but lepidoptera was his main interest and he published a large number of papers and notes mainly in the Entomologist's Gazette and The Entomologist's Record and Journal of Variation. In 1962 he published The Macrolepidoptera of Wiltshire.

De Worms was an extensive traveller, collecting lepidoptera in Europe, North Africa, Australia, the West Indies and Canada. He was a Fellow of the Royal Entomological Society of London and a member of both the London Natural History Society and the British Entomological and Natural History Society.

References

1903 births
1979 deaths
People from Egham
People educated at Eton College
Alumni of King's College, Cambridge
Fellows of the Royal Entomological Society
Rothschild family
English chemists
English lepidopterists
20th-century British zoologists